Stavangerpark, also known as the city park, is located around Breiavatnet in the centre of Stavanger, Norway. It is a quiet park, with a lot of doves, ducks, swans and other birds. The Stavanger Cathedral, which dates from around the year 1100, is located in the park.

External links
 http://www.stavangerpark.com/templates/b3007/images/parkenback2.jpg
 http://www.stavangerpark.com/fra_park.jpg
 https://web.archive.org/web/20060222200649/http://www.stavangerpark.com/domkirke.jpg-for-web-LARGE.jpg

Stavanger
Tourist attractions in Stavanger
Parks in Norway